Buron is a village in France about 6 kilometres north-west of Caen, in the communes of Cairon, Rosel and Saint-Contest in Calvados.

History

Buron was the site of two major battles, one on June 7, 1944, and another during Operation Charnwood on July 8, 1944, when the Highland Light Infantry of Canada liberated the town from defending elements of the 12th SS Panzer Division.

References

External links
1944, The Battle of Normandy: Buron

Villages in Normandy